Kalyandurg is a town in Anantapur district of the Indian state of Andhra Pradesh. It is the headquarters for Kalyandurg mandal and Kalyandurg revenue division. The discovery of diamond-bearing Kimberlites in Kalyandurg area, is one of the clusters that has been discovered.

History 
Kalyandurgam was under the rule of Sri Krishnadevaraya and was a part of Vijayanagara Empire. 

As per The imperial gazetteer of India, Rayadurg, Chitradurga and Kalyandurgam are the three important forts which were ruled by Boya Palegars. The name Kalyandurg came from Boya Kalyanappa, who was a Palaegar in the 16th century. Kalyandurg was very turbulent during the Vijayanagar rule.   

Kalyandurg taluk was formed in December 1893 by the British out of portions of Dharmavaram and of the Rayadurg taluk of Bellary. In March 2012 Kalyandurg became a municipality.

Kalyandurg was a taluk of Anantapur district in Madras province which was earlier a part of Dharmavaram that was separated in 1893.

Sri Subrahmanyeswara Swamy temple is located at the heart of the town. This temple was built in around 16th century.

Anantapur district is replete with Megalithic remains. In the vicinity of Kalyanadurg, several hundred megalithic monuments, such as dolemnoid cists and cairn circles are situated at the foothills and the slopes of the Akkamma Vari hills. Another large group of cairn circles is 2 km north of Akkamma Gari Konda. Similar remains are located at Mudigallu, a village about 5 km easterly to Kalyandurg, and Muthalabanda village, 2 km north east of town, and Gallaplli situated towards Rayadurgam.

Geography 

It has an average elevation of 591 metres (1942 ft). The region of Kalyandurg area is an arid zone with poor stony red soils.

Demographics 

 Census of India, Kalyandurg had a population of 32,328. The population constituted 16,036 males and 16,292 females — a sex ratio of 1016 females per 1000 males. 3,404 children are in the age group of 0–6 years, of which 1,760 are boys and 1,644 are girls — a ratio of 979 per 1000. The average literacy rate stands at 74.14% with 21,443 literates, significantly higher than the state average of 67.41%.

Governance

Civic administration 

The municipal body oversees the supply of water with 70 litres per capita per day, in the form 453 public taps and 66 bore–wells.

Politics 

Kalyandurg (Assembly constituency) is one of 14 constituencies in Anantapur district, representing Andhra Pradesh Legislative Assembly.K. V. Ushashri Charan of YSR Congress Party is the present MLA representing Kalyandurg (Assembly constituency).

Members of Legislative Assembly

Education 
The primary and secondary school education is imparted by government, aided and private schools, under the School Education Department of the state. The medium of instruction followed by different schools are English and Telugu.

Transport 
The Kalyandurg railway station is under the jurisdiction of Bangalore railway division of South Western Railway Zone

See also 
Anantapur district

References

External links 

Cities and towns in Anantapur district
Mandal headquarters in Anantapur district